is a retired Japanese left-handed relief pitcher who played most of his career in Nippon Professional Baseball.

Fujita was part of the Japanese national baseball team in the 2006 World Baseball Classic.

He pitched every game of his career in relief and holds the Japanese record for most pitching appearances.

External links

1972 births
2006 World Baseball Classic players
Chiba Lotte Marines players
Fukuoka SoftBank Hawks players
Japanese baseball players
Living people
Nippon Professional Baseball pitchers
Baseball people from Kyoto Prefecture
Yomiuri Giants players